The 2011 Prix de l'Arc de Triomphe was a horse race held at Longchamp on Sunday 2 October 2011. It was the 90th running of the Prix de l'Arc de Triomphe.

The winner was Danedream, a three-year-old filly trained in Germany by Peter Schiergen. The winning jockey was Andrasch Starke.

Danedream was the second German-trained horse to win the "Arc". The only prior victory was that of Star Appeal in 1975.

The winning time of 2m 24.49s set a new record for the event. The previous record of 2m 24.60s was achieved by Peintre Celebre in 1997.

Unusually for the race, the first three finishers were all fillies.

Race details
 Sponsor: Qatar Racing and Equestrian Club
 Purse: €4,000,000; First prize: €2,285,600 
 Going: Good
 Distance: 2,400 metres
 Number of runners: 16
 Winner's time: 2m 24.49s (new record)

Full result

 Abbreviations: snk = short-neck; nk = neck

Winner's details
Further details of the winner, Danedream.
 Sex: Filly
 Foaled: 7 May 2008
 Country: Germany
 Sire: Lomitas; Dam: Danedrop (Danehill)
 Owners: Gestüt Burg Eberstein and Teruya Yoshida
 Breeder: Gestüt Brümmerhof

References

External links
 Colour Chart – Arc 2011

2011 in horse racing
 2011
2011 in French sport
2011 in Paris
October 2011 sports events in France